This is a list of the Austrian number-one singles and albums of 2012 as compiled by Ö3 Austria Top 40, the official chart provider of Austria.

References 

Number-one hits
Austria
2012